The Sam Aircraft Sam LS is a Canadian aircraft design, designed and produced by Sam Aircraft, formerly known as Haim Aviation of Lachute, Quebec. The aircraft was designed for the Canadian AULA and American light-sport aircraft rules and had its first flight on 26 February 2013.

Design and development
The Sam LS is a low-wing, tandem seat monoplane. It can be configured for conventional or tricycle landing gear. The fuselage is semi monocoque, with a welded 4130 steel tube protective cockpit cage structure and aluminum skin. Three different wing planforms for light-sport, STOL and amateur-built categories can be installed to a common fuselage. The aircraft can be flown open cockpit with the canopy removed.

Prior to its first flight a prototype was shown at the 2012 EAA airshow.

As of June 2013 the aircraft was on Transport Canada's list of accepted advanced ultralights, but has not completed US Federal Aviation Administration special light-sport aircraft approval.

In July 2013 pricing was announced for kits and sub-kits, including wings, fuselage and empennage. In a break from normal industry practice the company said that it would offer those three sub-kits for a total that was the same as if they were ordered as a single kit, US$29,000. The complete kit with a  Rotax 912ULS engine and Dynon Skyview avionics was forecast to cost US$65,000 at that time, taking a factory-estimated 900 hours to complete.

By August 2014 the company was up for sale as SAM Aircraft President Thierry Zibi indicated that he would rather develop new designs than run a production operation. Zibi was hoping to find a buyer to produce the aircraft. In November 2015 the rights to the design, parts, jigs, molds, data and the prototype aircraft were being all offered for US$100,000.

In January 2016 Zenith Aircraft announced that it had purchased the Sam design and was planning to produce kits alongside the existing Chris Heintz designs.

Specifications (Sam LS)

See also

References

External links

Low-wing aircraft
Light-sport aircraft
Single-engined tractor aircraft
Aircraft first flown in 2013
2000s Canadian sport aircraft